Abbanakuppe may refer to:

 Abbanakuppe, Bangalore Rural, a village in Bangalore Rural district, Karnataka, India
 Abbanakuppe, Tumkur, a village in Tumkur district, Karnataka, India